= 2024 March Madness =

2024 March Madness may refer to:

- 2024 NCAA Division I men's basketball tournament
- 2024 NCAA Division I women's basketball tournament
